Pocharam Lake is located in Nizamabad district in the Indian state of Telangana. It is adjacent to Pocharam Forest & Wildlife Sanctuary.

References

Nizamabad, Telangana
Lakes of Telangana